Bunopus crassicauda, also known as the thickhead rock gecko or thick-tailed tuberculated gecko is a species of gecko endemic to Iran.

References

Bunopus
Reptiles described in 1907
Taxa named by Alexander Nikolsky